The 2022 Giro Donne was the 33rd edition of the Giro d'Italia Femminile women's road cycling stage race. The race started on 30 June 2022 and finished on 10 July 2022.

Teams 

Thirteen UCI Women's WorldTeams, along with eleven UCI Women's Continental Teams, participated in the race.

UCI Women's WorldTeams

 
 
 
 
 
 
 
 
 
 
 
 
 

UCI Women's Continental Teams

 
 
 
 
 
 Colombia Tierra de Atletas–GW–Shimano
 
 
 Team Mendelspeck

Route

Stages

Prologue 
30 June 2022 — Cagliari,  (ITT)

Stage 1 
1 July 2022 — Villasimius to Tortolì,

Stage 2 
2 July 2022 — Cala Gonone to Olbia,

Rest day 
3 July 2022 — Cesena

Stage 3 
4 July 2022 — Cesena to Cesena,

Stage 4 
5 July 2022 — Carpi to Reggio Emilia,

Stage 5 
6 July 2022 — Sarnico to Bergamo,

Stage 6 
7 July 2022 — Prevalle to Passo del Maniva,

Stage 7 
8 July 2022 — Rovereto to Aldeno,

Stage 8 
9 July 2022 — San Michele All'Adige to San Lorenzo,

Stage 9 
10 July 2022 — Abano Terme to Padova,

Classification leadership table

Classification standings

General classification

Points classification

Mountains classification

Young rider classification

Italian rider classification

Team classification

See also 
 2022 in women's road cycling

Notes

References

External links 
 

Giro d'Italia Femminile
2022
Giro d'Italia Femminile
Giro d'Italia Femminile